Thomas W. Swetnam (born 1955) is Regents' Professor Emeritus of Dendrochronology at the University of Arizona, studying disturbances of forest ecosystems across temporal and spatial scales. He served as the Director  of the Laboratory of Tree-Ring Research from 2000 to 2015.

Education 

Swetnam received his bachelor's degree in biology and chemistry from the  University of New Mexico and subsequently received his master's and PhD from the University of Arizona in watershed management and dendrochronology.

Recognition 

He received the A.E. Douglass award from the University of Arizona, the W.S. Cooper award from the Ecological Society of America (with Julio Betancourt) and the Henry Cowles award from the American Association of Geographers (with James H. Speer). He was elected a Fellow of the American Association For the Advancement of Science in 2015. He received the Harold C. Fritts Lifetime Achievement Award from the Tree-Ring Society in 2016. He received the Harold Biswell Award for Lifetime Achievement from the Association for Fire Ecology in 2016.

Advisor 
He has served on the following advisory and editorial boards:

Board of trustees, Valles Caldera National Preserve (2000-2004); Arizona Forest Health Advisory Council (2003-2006); Arizona Climate Change Advisory Group (2005-2006); associate editor, International Journal of Wildland Fire, (1993–present); editor, Tree-Ring Research (2000-2001); associate editor, Ecoscience (1994-1998); associate editor, Canadian Journal of Forest Research (1998); editorial board, Ecological Applications (1998-1999); associate editor, Dendrochronlogia, (2005–2012); board of trustees, The Nature Conservancy, New Mexico, 2016–2019.

Research 

He has authored and co-authored more than 120 scientific papers in journals and symposium proceedings, including the following frequently cited/significant papers:

 
 
 
 Swetnam, T. W. and C. H. Baisan, 1996.  Historical fire regime patterns in the Southwestern United States since AD 1700.  In C. Allen, editor, Fire effects in Southwestern Forests, Proceedings of the Second La Mesa Fire Symposium, Los Alamos, New Mexico, March 29–31, 1994. USDA Forest Service General Technical Report RM-GTR-286:11-32.

Edited books 

 Dean, J. S., D. M. Meko, and T. W. Swetnam, eds., 1996. Tree Rings, Environment, and Humanity, Proceedings of the International Conference, Tucson, Arizona, 17–21 May 1994. Radiocarbon, Tucson Arizona. 889 pp.

References

External links 
 University homepage

1955 births
Living people
University of New Mexico alumni
University of Arizona alumni
University of Arizona faculty
American scientists